Unín is a village and municipality in Skalica District in the Trnava Region of western Slovakia.

History
In historical records the village was first mentioned in 1392.

Geography
The municipality lies at an altitude of 269 metres and covers an area of 22.727 km². It has a population of about 1,180 people.

References

External links

 Official page

Villages and municipalities in Skalica District